Gerrard James Gosens, OAM (born 3 February 1970) is a vision-impaired Australian Paralympic athlete, goalball player, triathlete, adventurer, chocolatier and motivational speaker.

Personal 

Gosens was born on 3 February 1970 in Melbourne, Victoria. He is congenitally blind and became Australia's youngest guide dog recipient at age sixteen. At the age of eleven his family moved to Yeppoon in Queensland and he attended Yeppoon State High School. He has completed a Business Management degree at Queensland University of Technology (1992–1994) and Bachelor of Journalism at the University of Queensland (1994–1996). From 1994 to 2002, he was employed by the Australian Paralympic Committee. He has been Deputy CEO for Royal Blind Foundation Queensland and worked for Vision Australia. In 2019, he was forced to shut down his business 'Chocolate Moments' in Brisbane due to the disruption caused by the Cross River Rail project.

He married Heather in 1993 and they have two children, son Jordan and daughter Taylor.  Taylor was born with his congenital eyesight condition, and has just four per cent vision.

Gosens encourages others with the saying "Every one of us have some sort of obstacle to overcome, instead of letting them getting in the way, we should learn to take advantage of any opportunities we come across".

Sporting career 

Gosens is classified as a T11 athlete. Gosens competed at the 1996 Atlanta Paralympics in goalball. At the 2000 Sydney Paralympics, he competed with guides Bill Hunter and Ed Salmon in three running events – sixth in Men's 5000 m T11, sixth in the Men's 10000 m T11 and eight in the Men's Marathon T11. At the 2002 IPC Athletics World Championships, Lille, France, he finished fourth in the Men's 1500 m T11 and sixth in the Men's 5000 m T11.  At the 2006 IPC Athletics World Championships, Assen, Netherlands, he finished fifth in the Men's 1500 m T11. At the 2008 Beijing Paralympics with guide Bruce Jones, he finished sixth in the Men's 1500 m T11.  At the 2011 IPC Athletics World Championships, Christchurch, New Zealand, he finished fourth in his heat of the Men's 1500 m T11 and was ranked fourth. He was disqualified in his heat of the Men's 5000 m T11.

In 2016, Gosens took up triathlon as a result of using swimming as rehabilitation for an injured knee. He is classified as a B1 paratriathlete. He has the goal of competing in paratriathlon at the 2020 Tokyo Paralympics. In 2019, Gosens was caught up in a doping scandal after his guide Stephen Thompson tested positive to EPO at the 2018 ITU World Championships, Gold Coast, Queensland.  Gosens competed with Thompson two days after Thompson won the silver medal at the World Championships 35 to 39 age group race. Gosens was disqualified due to Thompson's EPO test because he was his guide.

At the 2022 Commonwealth Games in Birmingham, England with guide Hayden Armstrong, finished 6th in the Men's PTVI.

Other activities 
In 2005, his attempt to conquer Mount Everest ended when he fell down a crevasse his guide forgot to tell him about. He has co-piloted an ultra-light motor glider around Queensland three times. Gosens has run the 2,000 kilometres from Cairns to Brisbane five times to raise money for charity.

In 2009, he became the first contestant with a visual impairment to appear on the Australian television programme Dancing with the Stars (Australian TV series) on season Nine. His partner was Jessica Raffa and they were the eighth partnership eliminated. His participation raised funds for Vision Australia It is reported Gosens has raised over A$2 million worth in services and funds for the 120 000 blind people in Australia.

Recognition 

 1995 – Young Queenslander of the Year
 2000 – Ansvar Athlete of the Year
 2001 – Centenary Medal for distinguished service to sport particularly through the Paralympics
 2012 – Medal of the Order of Australia for service to people who are blind or vision impaired, and to sport
 2012 –  Fervent Global Love of Lives medal from the Chou Ta-Kuan Cultural and Educational Foundation
 2018 – International Day of People with Disability Patron

See also 

 Australia men's national goalball team

References

External links 

 International Paralympic Committee Profile
 Athletics Australia Results
 International Triathlon Union Results

Paralympic athletes of Australia
Paralympic goalball players of Australia
Goalball players at the 1996 Summer Paralympics
Athletes (track and field) at the 2000 Summer Paralympics
Athletes (track and field) at the 2008 Summer Paralympics
Visually impaired long-distance runners
Paratriathletes of Australia
Triathletes at the 2022 Commonwealth Games
University of Queensland alumni
Queensland University of Technology alumni
Recipients of the Medal of the Order of Australia
Australian blind people
1970 births
Living people
20th-century Australian people
21st-century Australian people
Visually impaired marathon runners
Paralympic long-distance runners
Paralympic marathon runners
Sportspeople from Melbourne
Sportsmen from Victoria (Australia)
Sportspeople from Brisbane
Sportsmen from Queensland